Tropisms is an experimental novel by Nathalie Sarraute, first published in 1939. It is considered a forerunner of the Nouveau Roman. Jean Genet, Marguerite Duras and Jean-Paul Sartre all described it as a masterpiece.

The title refers to tropisms, stimuli to plant growth; in the human sense, Sarraute imagined tropisms as "interior movements that precede and prepare our words and actions, at the limits of our consciousness."

It was ranked #73 in Le Monde's 100 Books of the Century.

Content
Tropisms consists of twenty-four short vignettes, capturing brief scenes in minute detail.

References

1939 French novels
French philosophical novels